Solomon Bockarie (born 18 May 1987), sometimes Solomon Bayoh (born 18 May 1990), is a male Dutch sprinter. He competed in the 4 × 100 metres relay at the 2015 World Championships in Athletics in Beijing, China. He competed in the 2016 Summer Olympics.

He was born in Makeni, Sierra Leone and is a naturalised Dutch citizen. 

Bayoh represented Sierra Leone at the 2008 Summer Olympics in Beijing. He competed at the 200 metres and placed eighth in his first round heat in a time of 22.16 seconds, which was not enough to advance to the second round. He was one of three competitors at the Olympics competing for Sierra Leone. Michaela Kargbo and Saidu Kargbo were the others. He again represented his birth nation at the 2014 Commonwealth Games.

In 2022, he failed an out-of-contest drugs test, on the basis of testing positive for the growth hormone GHRP-2; he has claimed that this was due to eating chicken contaminated with the hormone.

See also
 Netherlands at the 2015 World Championships in Athletics

References

External links
 
 
 Solomon Bockarie at olympics.org
 
 
 
 

1987 births
Living people
Dutch male sprinters
Sierra Leonean male sprinters
People from Makeni
World Athletics Championships athletes for the Netherlands
Athletes (track and field) at the 2016 Summer Olympics
Olympic athletes of the Netherlands
Olympic athletes of Sierra Leone
Athletes (track and field) at the 2008 Summer Olympics
Athletes (track and field) at the 2014 Commonwealth Games
Commonwealth Games competitors for Sierra Leone
20th-century Dutch people
21st-century Dutch people